Hector Joseph "Hurricane" Kilrea (June 11, 1907 — September 6, 1969) was a Canadian ice hockey forward. He played for the Ottawa Senators, Detroit Falcons, Toronto Maple Leafs and Detroit Red Wings in the National Hockey League between 1925 and 1940. After his NHL career Kilrea spent four years in the American Hockey League, and retired in 1943. A noted scorer during his career, Kilrea twice finished in the top ten for scoring, and won the Stanley Cup three times, with the Senators in 1927 and Red Wings in 1936 and 1937. His brothers Ken and Wally, and nephew Brian were also NHL players. After retiring from hockey Kilrea served in the United States Army during World War II, and was awarded the Distinguished Service Cross. Later in life Kilrea worked for the Ford Motor Company, and died in 1969.

Playing career
Kilrea made his National Hockey League (NHL) debut in 1925 with the Ottawa Senators. In 1929–30 he finished fifth in league scoring with 58 points in 44 games Kilrea spent six seasons with the Senators before the team suspended operations for the 1931–32 season, owing to financial difficulties. The Senators players were dispersed among the other NHL teams, with Kilrea selected by the Detroit Falcons. He played the season there before rejoining the Senators for 1932–33. He was then traded to the Toronto Maple Leafs, playing two seasons there before going to the Detroit Red Wings (the Falcons had renamed themselves in 1932). Kilrea played the last five seasons of his NHL career with Detroit, and followed that with four seasons in the minor American Hockey League (AHL), all with the Indianapolis Capitals. With Indianapolis he won the Calder Cup as AHL champions in 1941–42.

Personal life
Kilrea was born in Blackburn, Ontario. Aside from hockey, he  was also a champion speed skater, and once won a race at the Montreal Forum in 1928, circuiting the ice in 16 2/5 seconds. After his playing career Kilrea worked for the Ford Motor Company.

His brothers Ken Kilrea, and Wally Kilrea, and nephew Brian Kilrea also played in the NHL. Brian would later become a coach, and coached the Ottawa 67s of the Ontario Hockey League for 31 years.

Military career
After his retirement from hockey Kilrea became a U.S. citizen. With the outbreak of World War II he tried to enlist with the Canadian military, but being in his early 30s was considered too old. and like many others, enlisted for duty in World War II, finishing with the rank of staff sergeant. He saw action in Italy, including the Battle of Anzio and went on into France and Germany. On December 12, 1944 he took out a German tank, and was awarded the Distinguished Service Cross (the second highest military decoration of the United States Army) for this. He also received the Purple Heart and French Croix de Guerre. He served with Company "K", 143rd Infantry Regiment, 36th Infantry Division.

Career statistics

Regular season and playoffs

References

Bibliography

External links

1907 births
1969 deaths
Canadian emigrants to the United States
Canadian ice hockey right wingers
Detroit Falcons players
Detroit Red Wings players
Ice hockey people from Ottawa
Indianapolis Capitals players
Ottawa Senators (1917) players
Recipients of the Distinguished Service Cross (United States)
Stanley Cup champions
Toronto Maple Leafs players
United States Army personnel of World War II